Key is a supervillain appearing in media published by DC Comics, primarily as an enemy of the Justice League. The character continues to appear in Justice League and Batman comics, with a ghoulish appearance since 1997.

Publication history

The Key first appeared in Justice League of America #41, and was created by Gardner Fox and Mike Sekowsky.

Fictional character biography

The Key debuted in Justice League of America #41 (December 1965). The unidentified man known as the Key develops mind-expanding "psycho-chemicals" that activate his 10 senses. Assisted by henchmen known as "Key-Men" and a "key blaster" gun, the Key has several failed run-ins with the Justice League of America (JLA). The Key first drugs the Leaguers, which not only causes them to disband the Justice League, but also physically blinds them to the existence of the Key and his Key-Men. The Key fails to take into account Hawkman's sidekick, Hawkgirl, who frees him from the drug's effects. They free the other Leaguers, and the Key is imprisoned.

The Key returns three years later. During his last attack on the League, he left a subconscious command in their minds that would not allow them to leave the League's headquarters for one hour. At the end of that time, each Leaguer would turn on another and kill him or her. Superman defeats the Key by going back in time and sending his un-hypnotized self forward in time. He defeats each Leaguer in turn, and then imprisons the Key in the Fortress of Solitude in suspended animation.

The Key appeared to die six years later. He wires an entire city block of St. Louis, Missouri, with bombs, forcing the Justice League to pass through a series of traps to reach the device which will stop the detonation. The Key reveals that he was freed by a judge who found Superman's actions an unconstitutional use of cruel and unusual punishment. Incarcerated in a regular prison, he learns the psychoactive drugs he has taken have left him mere months to live. Released on humanitarian grounds, he attempts to destroy the League. The Phantom Stranger impersonates one of the Key-Men, helping to save the League. Green Lantern John Stewart uses his power ring to drive the explosive force of the bombs down into the ground, and the Key escapes at the last moment.

The Key appears again in Justice League of America #150 (January 1978). The Manhunter Mark Shaw has given up his old identity to become a new hero named the Privateer. Doctor Light attempts to gain access to the Justice League Satellite, but is driven off by the Privateer. Light encounters a new villain, the Star-Tsar, and they briefly engage in battle. When former League mascot Snapper Carr is discovered near the site of a battle with the Star-Tsar's henchmen, the Star Lords, the League becomes suspicious and travels to Snapper's home to speak with the Carr family. Light traps the League in his "Spetriminator", but they free themselves. They rush off to find Light, but instead encounter an unconscious Star-Tsar—who is unmasked as Snapper Carr. Star-Tsar is freed by his henchmen, but their getaway vehicles leave behind a distinctive radioactive trace. Several League members trace this trail to the Star-Tsar's lair, where they are captured by the "real" Star-Tsar (who has imprisoned Carr). The League free themselves and the "real" Star-Tsar is discovered to be the Key. The Key reveals that the bombs he used in St. Louis were "stellar bombs" designed to give off a peculiar kind of radiation. When the Green Lantern John Stewart used his power ring to contain the blast, it drove the radiation downward into the Key's subterranean lair where the Key had prepared machinery to utilize the radiation and prevent his death. But the dying Key was only able to close his machinery over his head. The Key's body survived albeit in a dwarfish form, while his head remained life-size. Building a robotic body for himself, he approached a disillusioned Carr, provided him with weapons and henchmen, and launched his latest attack on the Justice League. The Red Tornado, however, discloses that the Key is not the real Star-Tsar, either: Mark Shaw is. Shaw came up with the villainous identity and approached the Key for help, which the Key gave. But when Shaw refused to work with the Key, the Key manufactured a mechanical Star-Tsar body and used Snapper Carr to carry out the Key/Star-Tsar's more athletic crimes (since the Key/Star-Tsar could appear alongside Snapper, no suspicion would fall on Snapper).

Still in his dwarfish, barely mobile form, the Key attempts to cure himself a few years later by reactivating the android Amazo, which was stored aboard the Justice League Satellite. He hopes that by absorbing the League's powers, his body can be restored. New League member Zatanna uses magic to cure the Key, restoring the powers to the League (who subdue Amazo). The Key makes a cameo appearance in Justice League of America #240 (July 1985). The time-traveling villain Dr. Anomaly observes the Key's second battle with the Justice League before launching his own attack on the superhero group.

The most recent incarnation of the Key is introduced in JLA #6 (June 1997), by Howard Porter and Grant Morrison, in a teaser at the beginning of the issue. The Moon begins to fall out of orbit in JLA #7 (July 1997), and the Key is seen to not be responsible. As the Leaguers return to the Justice League Watchtower on the Moon, the Key immobilizes them. The Key's new look is explained in JLA #8 (August 1997): The Key spent years in a drug-induced coma to unlock even more potential in his brain. The "psycho-chemicals" altered his appearance so that now the Key is a pale, cadaverous, white-haired humanoid with greatly heightened mental abilities. The Key uses a programmable "psycho-virus" to knock the Justice League's members unconscious and trap them in a dream that they all share (a fantastic type of dream telepathy). The Key states he is counting on the heroes' known aptitude for dispelling such illusions, and that as they wake, he intends to siphon off the resulting energy to open a door to creation and become the center of the universe. Most of JLA #8 and JLA #9 (September 1997) consists of stories occurring in these fantasy realms—including Kal-El as the Green Lantern of Sector 2813 on a still-existent Krypton, a now-retired Bruce Wayne going back into action when Tim Drake and Wayne's son face the Joker (who is dying of cancer), Aquaman in a time where Earth has been virtually flooded, and a powerless Wonder Woman facing Nazi archaeologists and demons. The Key almost succeeds in killing the heroes. The League is saved when the new Green Arrow, Connor Hawke, teleports to the JLA headquarters to attend a pre-arranged meeting to discuss becoming a member of the League. Hawke attacks the Key before he can complete his goal. The Key is incarcerated in Arkham Asylum, where the Martian Manhunter puts him in a "mental maze" (a form of coma).

The Key next appears in Gotham City, where he uses his psycho-chemicals to remove Batman's inhibition against killing. The Key's goal is to have Batman kill him, so that he might unlock the secret of death. Batgirl and Azrael must prevent Batman from committing murder until the drug wears off. The Key makes an appearance, along with a large group of villains, attacking the Justice League and Marvel Comics' the Avengers in 2003.

The JLA disbands in the "World without a Justice League" storyline in 2006, in which the Key plays a major part. The Key emerges from the "mental maze" with his telepathic powers even more greatly enhanced. Unable to shut out the voices of millions of people, the Key comes close to insanity before realizing that killing people helps calm the voices. The Key commits a large number of murders in Metropolis, which the Justice League investigates. The Key kidnaps the heroine sorceress Manitou Dawn, and attempts to merge his mind with hers to wipe all human life from Earth. The League stops him, but his new Key-Man android delays the heroes long enough to allow him to escape. The Key mentally orders thousands of people to kill one another. As the League separately battles the Seven Deadly Sins, the personification of Envy tries to stop the Key to keep envy (a human emotion) alive. Envy tries to use the Key to enter the minds of millions of people and listen to their seedy thoughts, but the Key resists and breaks free—forcing a temporarily unpowered Envy to flee. The Key begs Manitou Dawn to kill him, but she sends him to a "dream plane" instead, where he will hear no voices and can be at peace.

During the Infinite Crisis miniseries, the Key is shown during the Battle of Metropolis, although whether this takes place just before the events of "World without a Justice League" or after is not clear. He is later briefly seen to be a member of the Injustice League.

The Key reappears in Justice League of America (vol. 2) #17-18 (March–April 2008), although neither his cure nor his escape from the "dream plane" are explained. The Suicide Squad is collecting the world's supervillains to send them to the prison planet Salvation. Several villains, led by the Key, take refuge with the Justice League and are imprisoned. The villains assume that, once the danger of exile is past, the Key will be able to free them whenever they wish, but a dampening field in the prison prevents the Key from using his enhanced intelligence. The Key next appears having escaped from the Justice League's prison (somehow), and is briefly depicted as a member of the Secret Society of Super-Villains. He is next seen meeting with the supervillain Roulette a year later to receive information she had collected on the League. The Key is apparently working for someone else, but who it is, is never revealed.

The Key's next major appearance came in Batman: The Dark Knight (vol. 2) #1 (November 2011). The Key is depicted incarcerated in Arkham Asylum (although how he got there is unclear). An aggression-enhancing toxin is released into the air at Arkham, and Batman must battle the Key and a number of other villains as he penetrates the hospital to reach Two-Face.  The Key makes another major appearance in the Justice League comic a year later, when he is freed from his cell during a riot at Arkham Asylum. Although quickly captured by Batman, Superman and Cyborg, the Key reveals that he and the Weapons Master were broken out of their cells only so that they could be interrogated by a new villain, David Graves, who wanted to know the weaknesses of the Justice League.

The Key apopeared in a flashback in Black Canary and Zatanna: Bloodspell (July 2014). The Key's most recent appearance is in World's Finest #8 (December 2022). He has instilled entamaphobia (the fear of doors) in everyone in Gotham City. People are afraid to leave their homes, businesses or automobiles. The Key is demanding five billion dollars in ransom.

DC Rebirth
Talking with an unspecified force that is implied to be trapped, as seen during the DC Rebirth reboot, the Key captures Batman, Nightwing, Wonder Woman, Donna Troy, Barry Allen, Wally West, Aquaman and Tempest and traps them in a specially designed prison, with the goal of driving the mentors and protégés to destroy each other by exploiting their differences and paranoia. However, the heroes manage to overcome the Key's attempt to keep them divided and they attack him directly, forcing the Key to withdraw without gathering sufficient power to release his unknown associate. His benefactor was later revealed to be Troia, a dark future version of Donna Troy. He along with Mr. Twister and Psimon fought the Titans before driving Troia back into the abyss.

Powers and abilities
Originally, the Key carried a blaster in the shape of a key. The psycho-chemicals he created also allowed him to access the 90 percent of the human brain that is untapped. This vastly increased his intelligence and expanded his range of senses. The Key also had a large number of henchmen known as Key-Men, who acted as bodyguards and who had enough limited fighting skills to delay heroes (and allow the Key to effect an escape).

The Key is a master of chemistry, and utilizes chemicals (most often in the form of drugs) as weapons. He used drugs to bend the Justice League to his will twice, and Batman once. More recently, the Key created a programmable psycho-virus that initiates a dream-like state that allows the Key to produce structured hallucinations. He created a machine that allowed him to steal energy from the mind of the infected person, and conceivably could make him the most powerful telepath in the universe (even able to open dimensional doorways at will).

The Key has shown an extraordinary capacity for creating androids and various kinds of machines. Aside from building his own Key-Man servant (which has some resistance to physical attacks and limited offensive capabilities), he was able to control the highly advanced Amazo android as well. The Key built weapons and other devices capable of harnessing stellar radiation for their power, altering the Moon's orbit, harnessing dream-energy, and regenerating his own body using radiation. On one occasion, the Key developed a "vibrational prison" which was capable of immobilizing a wide range of heroes (including Superman). More recently, the Key altered his key-blaster so that instead of firing energy bolts, it fires psycho-chemicals which can disable practically any living organism.

Other versions
 An unrelated villain, also called the Key, had previously appeared in All Star Comics #57 (March 1951), which featured the last Golden Age appearance of the Justice Society of America. In this story, the Key is the head of a major crime syndicate and uses various agents around the world to engage in crime. While escaping from the Justice Society in a cable car moving over a gorge, the Key leaps out to avoid capture, presumably falling to his death.

In other media

Television
 The Key appears in Justice League Unlimited, voiced by Corey Burton. This version is a member of Gorilla Grodd's Secret Society who specializes in penetrating secure areas, possesses a form of intangibility, and wields a key-shaped gun that can easily open doors as well as operate like a regular gun. In audio commentary, the series producers stated that the Key was originally going to be possessed by, or be connected to, Brainiac, and play a larger role in the episode "Alive!". Prior to and during the aforementioned episode, Lex Luthor takes control of the Society, but Grodd mounts a mutiny. Key sides with the latter, only to be frozen by Killer Frost and killed off-screen by Darkseid along with Grodd's other loyalists.
 The Key appears in the Beware the Batman, voiced by JB Blanc. This version is a diminutive, elderly shopkeeper able to mold his fingers to fit any lock and download digital security keys from computers into his brain. Additionally, he is an expert forger who creates new identities for a high price.

Film
The Key makes a cameo appearance in Justice League: The New Frontier.

Video games
The Key appears as a boss in Justice League Heroes, voiced by Carlos Alazraqui. This version is affiliated with Brainiac.

Miscellaneous
 The Key appears in the Green Lantern Corps Quarterly short story "G'nortin' But Trouble".
 The Key appears in Batman: The Brave and the Bold #5.
 The Key appears in DC Super Friends #6.

See also
 List of Batman family enemies

References

External links
 Guide to the DC Universe: The Key

DC Comics characters with accelerated healing
DC Comics supervillains
DC Comics metahumans
DC Comics scientists
DC Comics characters who have mental powers
DC Comics characters with superhuman senses
DC Comics telepaths
Fictional characters with albinism
Fictional characters without a name
Comics characters introduced in 1965
Characters created by Gardner Fox
Characters created by Mike Sekowsky